Joué-du-Plain is a commune in the Orne department in north-western France. The commune was mentioned in 1216 by the name of "Jeum". There are 201 people living there. The river Udon flows through the commune. The community festival is 29 June.

Important places
The church in the commune is dedicated to Saints Gervais and Portais.  The architectural elements are pointed arches, a Norman tower and Roman arches. The church was rebuilt in the Renaissance. Inside the church are sculptures of St. Gervais and Saint Portais made in the 18th century. Also, there is an 18th-century sculpture of Saint Michael made in stone and painted. There are also sculpted wooden stalls, a statue of the Virgin Mary and a baptismal font made in the 18th century. The cemetery around the church has two 16th century entrances.

Another important place in the commune is Chateau de la Motte. The chateau is a 19th-century building.

Legends
Joué-du-Plain has a legend that the lord of Chantelou killed his wife and her lover. The lord painted the front of his chateau with their blood. The farm called Baritaur is the former place of the lord called "Red House of Chante-lou"

See also
Communes of the Orne department
Château de la Motte, Joué du Plain

References

Joueduplain